Glyphodes bitriangulalis is a moth of the family Crambidae described by Max Gaede in 1917. It is found in South Africa (Gauteng), Zimbabwe, and Mali.

This species has a wingspan of 26 mm and looks close to Glyphodes boseae Saalmüller, 1880 and Glyphodes mascarenalis de Joannis, 1906.

References

Moths described in 1917
Glyphodes